New Mark Commons is a historic planned development in Rockville, Maryland.  It consists of a residential area south of Maryland Avenue and east of Interstate 270, and is accessed via Potomac Valley Road and New Mark Esplanade.  It was planned and built as a collaborative effort by the architectural firm Keyes, Lethbridge & Condon and builder Edmund J. Bennett, and was built between 1967 and 1973.  Its design includes winding roads in a wooded landscape, with many cul-de-sacs, and pedestrian paths for connecting residential areas to recreational amenities.

The district was listed on the National Register of Historic Places in 2017.

References

Historic districts on the National Register of Historic Places in Maryland
Historic districts in Montgomery County, Maryland
National Register of Historic Places in Montgomery County, Maryland
Rockville, Maryland